Selwa Carmen Showker "Lucky" Roosevelt (born January 13, 1929) was Chief of Protocol of the United States for almost seven years from 1982-1989—longer than anyone else has ever served in that position.

Early life
Selwa was born in the city of Kingsport, Tennessee, the daughter of Lebanese Druze immigrants, Salim Shqer and Najla Shqer. She lived there until her marriage in 1950 to Archibald "Archie" B. Roosevelt Jr., a grandson of President Theodore Roosevelt. They were married for forty years until Archie died of heart failure in 1990.

An honors graduate from Vassar College, Lucky has worked as a journalist for The Washington Evening Star  and a freelance writer for numerous magazines, among them Family Circle, McCalls and Town & Country, where she was a contributing editor for seven years.

She was the longest serving Chief of Protocol serving between 1982 and 1989. In 2012, Lucky received a commendation from President Barack Obama for her government service and for helping to "save" Blair House.

Her correspondence from Fleur Cowles is at the University of Texas at Austin.

Works
Keeper of the gate, Simon and Schuster, 1990,

Notes

Living people
People from Kingsport, Tennessee
Selwa Roosevelt
American people of Lebanese descent
Converts to Christianity from Druzism
Writers from Tennessee
Writers from Washington, D.C.
1929 births
American Druze
Vassar College alumni
Converts to Methodism
Methodists from Tennessee
Chiefs of Protocol of the United States